To the Last Man is a 1923 American silent Western film based on a novel by Zane Grey, produced by Adolph Zukor and Jesse L. Lasky from Famous Players-Lasky, distributed by Paramount Pictures, directed by Victor Fleming, and starring  Richard Dix, Lois Wilson, and Noah Beery. The cinematographer was James Wong Howe.

Plot summary

Cast

Preservation
A print of To the Last Man is held in the Gosfilmofond archive in Moscow.

1933 Remake
The picture was remade in 1933 under the direction of Henry Hathaway starring Randolph Scott, Esther Ralston, Noah Beery Sr. repeating his 1923 role, Jack La Rue, Buster Crabbe, Barton MacLane, an unbilled Shirley Temple, Fuzzy Knight, Gail Patrick, and an unbilled John Carradine.

References

External links

 
 
 
 

1923 films
1923 Western (genre) films
Films based on works by Zane Grey
American black-and-white films
Films based on American novels
Films directed by Victor Fleming
1923 drama films
Silent American Western (genre) films
1920s American films
1920s English-language films